A treaty of the Holy See is called a Concordat. This is a list.

11th century
Treaty of Melfi (1059; Normans)
Treaty of Ceprano (1080) (Normans)

12th century
Concordat of Worms (1122; Holy Roman Empire)
Treaty of Mignano (1139)
Treaty of Constance (1153) (Holy Roman Empire)
Treaty of Benevento (1156; Sicily)
Treaty of Venice (1177; Holy Roman Empire, Lombard League)

13th century
Treaty of Speyer (1209) (Holy Roman Empire)
Treaty of Ceprano (1230) (Holy Roman Empire)
Treaty of San Germano (1230; Holy Roman Empire)
Concordat of the Forty Articles (1289; Portugal)
Treaty of Tarascon (1291; Aragon, France, Naples)
Treaty of Anagni  (1295; Aragon, France, Naples, and Majorca)

15th century
Fürsten Konkordat between Pope Eugenius IV and the Princes Electors of the Holy Roman Empire (Jan 1447)
Concordat of Vienna (1448;  Holy Roman Empire)
Treaty of Bagnolo (1489; Ferrara, Venice)

16th century
Concordat of Bologna (1516; France)
Treaty of London (1518) (France, England, Holy Roman Empire, Spain, Burgundy, and the Netherlands)

18th century
Treaty of Tolentino (1797; France)

19th century
Concordat of 1801 (France)
Concordat of 11 June 1817 (France)
Concordat of 24 October 1817 (Bavaria)
Concordat of 16 February 1818 (Naples)
1847 Agreement between the Holy See and Russia
Concordat of 1851 (Spain)
Concordat of 1854 (Guatemala)
Concordat of 1887 (Colombia)

20th century
Concordat of 1922 (Latvia)
Concordat of 1925 (Poland)
Concordat of 1928 (Colombia)
Lateran Treaty (1929; Italy)
Prussian Concordat (1929)
Concordat of 1933 (1933; Austria)
Reichskonkordat (1933; Germany)
Concordat of 1940 (Portugal)
Concordat of 1953 (Spain)
Concordat of 1993 (Poland)
Treaties between the Republic of Croatia and the Holy See (1996-1998)

21st century
Concordat of 2004 (Portugal)
Treaty of 2004 (Slovakia)
Concordat of 2008 (Brazil)
Concordat of 2009  (Schleswig-Holstein)
Agreement of 2019 (Burkina Faso)

See also
Vatican and Eastern Europe (1846–1958)
Padroado 
Patronato real

References